The men's 12.5 kilometre free competition of the 2022 Winter Paralympics was held at the National Biathlon Center in Beijing on 12 March 2022.

Medal table

12.5 km free visually impaired
In the cross-country skiing visually impaired, the athlete with a visual impairment has a sighted guide. The two skiers are considered a team, and dual medals are awarded.

12.5 km free standing

10 km free sitting

See also
Cross-country skiing at the 2022 Winter Olympics

References

Men's 12.5 kilometre